Radial neuropathy  is a type of mononeuropathy which results from acute trauma to the radial nerve that extends the length of the arm. It is known as transient paresthesia when sensation is temporarily abnormal.

Signs and symptoms
Symptoms of radial neuropathy vary depending on the severity of the trauma; however, common symptoms may include wrist drop, numbness on the back of the hand and wrist, and inability to voluntarily straighten the fingers. Loss of wrist extension is due to loss of the ability to move of the posterior compartment of forearm muscles. In the event of lacerations to the wrist area the symptom would therefore be sensory. Additionally, depending on the type of trauma, other nerves may be affected such as the median nerve and axillary nerves.

Causes

There are many ways to acquire radial nerve neuropathy, including:
Upper arm - a fracture of the bone
Elbow - entrapment of the nerve
Wrist - elbow deformity and soft-tissue masses
Axilla - here the most common cause is compression. However, a dislocation of the humerus is a possible factor as well. It could also be due to brachial plexus compression.

Mechanism
The mechanism of radial neuropathy is such that it can cause focal demyelination and axonal degeneration. These would be caused via laceration or compression of the nerve in question.

Diagnosis
Radial neuropathy may be diagnosed using MRI, ultrasound, nerve conduction study or electromyography (EMG).

Treatment

The treatment and management of radial neuropathy can be achieved via the following methods:
 Physical therapy or occupational therapy
 Surgery (depending on the specific area and extent of damage)
Tendon transfer (the origin remains the same but insertion is moved)
 Splinting

Prognosis
Radial neuropathy is not necessarily permanent, though there could be partial loss of movement or sensation. Complications include deformity of the hand in some individuals. If the injury is axonal (the underlying nerve fiber itself is damaged), recovery may take months or years and full recovery may never occur. EMG and nerve conduction studies are typically performed to diagnose the extent and distribution of the damage, and to help with prognosis for recovery.

Culture and society
There are a number of terms used to describe radial nerve injuries, which are dependent on the causation factor such as:
 Honeymoon palsy from another individual sleeping on and compressing one's arm overnight.
 Saturday night palsy from falling asleep with one's arm hanging over the arm rest of a chair, compressing the radial nerve.
 Squash palsy, from traction forces associated with the sport squash, happens to squash players during periods between matches.

See also
 Crutch paralysis
 Peripheral neuropathy

References

Further reading

External links 

Peripheral nervous system disorders
Symptoms and signs: Nervous system
Mononeuropathies of upper limb